This is a list of diplomatic missions in South Sudan.  The capital city of Juba currently hosts 22 resident embassies.

Embassies in Juba

Consulates and diplomatic offices in Juba 
 (EUAVSEC South Sudan)
 (Representative Office)
 (Embassy Office)
 (Cooperation Office and Consular Agency)
 (United Nations Mission in South Sudan – UNMISS)

Non-resident embassies 

 (Buenos Aires)
 (Addis Ababa)
 (Addis Ababa)
 (Kampala)
 (Addis Ababa)
 (Nairobi)
 (Addis Ababa)
 (Addis Ababa)
 (Addis Ababa)
 (Addis Ababa) 
 (Nairobi)
 (Nairobi) 
 (Cairo)
 (Addis Ababa)
 (Addis Ababa)
 (Addis Ababa)
 (Addis Ababa)
 (Addis Ababa)
 (Addis Ababa)
 (Addis Ababa)
 (Cairo)
 (Nairobi)
 (Cairo)
 (Nairobi)
 (Addis Ababa)
 (Addis Ababa)
 (Jerusalem)
 (Addis Ababa)
 (Addis Ababa)
 (Addis Ababa)
 (Riyadh)
 (New Delhi)
 (Khartoum)
 (Addis Ababa)
 (Addis Ababa)
 (Nairobi)
 (Riyadh)
 (Addis Ababa)
 (Addis Ababa)
 (Addis Ababa)
 (Addis Ababa)
 (Khartoum)
 (Addis Ababa)
 (Djibouti City)
 (Cairo) 
 (Nairobi)
 (Addis Ababa)
 (Addis Ababa)
 (Khartoum)
 (Khartoum)
 (Kampala)
 (Kampala)
 (Addis Ababa) 
 (Kampala)
 (Addis Ababa)
 (Addis Ababa)
 (Nairobi)
 (Addis Ababa)
 (Kampala) 
 (Khartoum)
 (Nairobi)
 (Khartoum)
 (Addis Ababa)
 (Cairo)
 (Nairobi)
 (Nairobi)
 (Addis Ababa)
 (Riyadh)
 (Addis Ababa)
 (Addis Ababa)
 (Riyadh)
 (Khartoum)
 (Cairo)
 (Nairobi)

Embassies to Open
 (Juba)

See also
 Foreign relations of South Sudan
 List of diplomatic missions of South Sudan
 Embassies and consulates in and of South Sudan

References

List
South Sudan
Diplomatic missions
Diplomatic missions